DD Retro is an Indian Hindi-language TV channel. It was launched by Prasar Bharati on 13 April 2020. It is a free-to-air general entertainment channel on which old classic shows of Doordarshan are telecasted,

DD Retro channel has been added to Doordarshan's DTT service which is available in 19 cities across India. It is primarily dedicated to telecast Doordarshan's old classic TV productions from the 80s and 90s, many being the country's highest rating series ever produced for television.

Programming 

 Upanishad Ganga
 Mahabharat
 Chanakya
 Sankat Mochan Hanuman
 Byomkesh Bakshi
 Dekh Bhai Dekh
 Buniyaad
 Sai Baba Tere Hazaron Hath
 Rajani
 Circus
 The Jungle Book
 Baaje Payal
 Shrimaan Shrimati
 Savitri Ek Kranti
 Charitraheen (TV series)
 Dil Hai Phir Bhi Hindustani
 Mashaal
 Vishnu Puran
 Doosra Keval
 Kal Hamara Hai
 Maa Shakti
 Chandrakanta
 Draupadi
 Alif Laila
 Shaktimaan
 Jap Tap Vrat
 Kosish Se Kamiyabi Tak
 Karan The Detective

References 

Doordarshan
Television channels and stations established in 2020
Television stations in New Delhi
Hindi-language television channels in India
Classic television networks